Jeffrey M. Schwartz, M.D. is an American psychiatrist and researcher in the field of neuroplasticity and its application to obsessive-compulsive disorder (OCD). He is a proponent of mind/body dualism and appeared in the 2008 film Expelled: No Intelligence Allowed, in which he told interviewer Ben Stein that science should not be separated from religion.

Brain lock
Brain lock is a term coined by Schwartz to describe obsessive-compulsive behavior. His 1997 book Brain Lock: Free Yourself from Obsessive-Compulsive Behavior outlines the disorder and its treatment. In the book Schwartz claims that obsessive-compulsive disorder (OCD) is a result of a bio-chemical imbalance that "locks" brain functions into an obsessive-compulsive pattern and that OCD can be self-treated by following four steps:
Relabel the obsessive thoughts and compulsive urges as obsessions and compulsions, not as real thoughts. 
Reattribute the obsessive thoughts to a brain malfunction called OCD.
Refocus on a wholesome, productive activity for at least fifteen minutes.
Revalue the entire obsession and compulsion group as having no useful meaning in your life.

Publications

Books
Jeffrey Schwartz and Beverly Beyette, Brain Lock: Free Yourself from Obsessive-Compulsive Behavior, New York: Regan Books, 1997. .
Jeffrey Schwartz and Sharon Begley, The Mind and the Brain: Neuroplasticity and the power of mental force, New York: Regan Books, 2002. .
Jeffrey Schwartz, You Are Not Your Brain: The 4-Step Solution for Changing Bad Habits, Ending Unhealthy Thinking, and Taking Control of Your Life, New York: Avery, 2011. .

Articles
Schwartz, J. M., Stapp, H. P., and Beauregard, M. (2004). The volitional influence of the mind on the brain, with special reference to emotional self-regulation, in Beauregard, M. (Ed.), Consciousness, emotional self-regulation, and the brain, Philadelphia, PA: John Benjamins Publishing Company, chapter 7. .
Schwartz, J. M., Stapp, H. P., and Beauregard, M. (2005). Quantum physics in neuroscience and psychology: A neurophysical model of mind-brain interaction. Philosophical Transactions of the Royal Society of London, Series B, 360(1458):1309-27. Full paper
Schwartz, J. M., Gulliford, E. Z., Stier, J., and Thienemann, M. (2005). Mindful Awareness and Self-Directed Neuroplasticity: Integrating psychospiritual and biological approaches to mental health with a focus on obsessive compulsive disorder, in Mijares, S. G., and Khalsa, G. S. (Eds.), The Psychospiritual Clinician's Handbook: Alternative methods for understanding and treating mental disorders, Binghamton, NY: Haworth Reference Press, chapter 13. .

References

External links

American neuroscientists
Fellows of the International Society for Complexity, Information, and Design
Obsessive–compulsive disorder researchers
Living people
American Jews
Year of birth missing (living people)